Discocapnos is a genus of flowering plants belonging to the family Papaveraceae.

Its native range is South African Republic.

Species:
 Discocapnos mundii Cham. & Schltdl.

References

Papaveraceae
Papaveraceae genera